"Potion" is a song by Scottish disc jockey Calvin Harris, English-Albanian singer Dua Lipa and American rapper Young Thug from the former's sixth studio album, Funk Wav Bounces Vol. 2 (2022). The song was penned by Harris, Lipa, Thug, Jessie Reyez and Maneesh Bidaye, with the production completed by Harris. It was released as the lead single from the album for digital download and streaming in various countries by Sony on 27 May 2022. The song combines dance, disco, EDM, funk and pop music to create a laidback atmosphere, accompanied by 1970s-style instrumentation of bongos, electric guitars and pianos. Its lyrics center around the essence of a potion that promises a good summer experience.

"Potion" garnered a warm reception from music critics for its music, production and Lipa and Thug's vocal performances. The song reached number 16 on the UK Singles Chart and achieved a silver certification from the British Phonographic Industry (BPI) in the UK. It peaked at number 31 on the Canadian Hot 100 and number 71 the US Billboard Hot 100 as well as entering the top 50 in several countries, such as Australia, New Zealand and Ireland. The psychedelic music video premiered on Harris' YouTube channel on 27 May 2022. It was designed to combine a 1960's liquid light show with a contemporary setting and displays the journey of Lipa and Thug stranded in a tropical island in a purple ocean.

Background and composition 

In April 2022, Harris announced his forthcoming studio album Funk Wav Bounces Vol. 2 to be released in summer, as a continuation of his fifth album Funk Wav Bounces Vol. 1 (2017). The disc jockey previewed the album's lead single "Potion" on the social media platform TikTok on 24 May. In the preview, he showcased the development of the instrumental and a FaceTime call with Lipa, who had agreed to contribute her vocals. The song was released for digital download and streaming in various countries by Sony on 27 May 2022 as the lead single from Harris' sixth studio album Funk Wav Bounces Vol. 2 (2022). Marking Harris and Lipa's second collaboration following the release of "One Kiss" (2018), he elaborated, "It's an honour to work with Dua and Thug again [...] They're both such dynamic artists who have contributed so much to today's musical landscape."

"Potion" was penned by Harris (Adam Wiles), Lipa, Thug (Jeffery Williams), Jessie Reyez and Maneesh Bidaye, with the production completed by Harris. The song is composed in the key of D major and time signature of common time with a tempo ranging from 76 to 100 beats per minute. It follows in the chord progression of Em9-Fm-Gmaj7-Gmaj9-Em7-Fm-G6-Gmaj7-F in the intro and Bm7-B7-Gmaj7-Em-Fm7-Bm7 throughout. The vocal range in the song spans from a low note of A4 to a high note of G5. "Potion" is a laidback dance, disco, EDM, funk and pop song. The instrumental has a 1970s-inspired tone, which includes bongo, electric guitar and piano sounds. The song is anchored by a steamy hook from Lipa, a nimble verse from Thug, a snaking bassline, disco and retro beats, rhodes riff, seductive chorus, and synth-heavy groove. The lyrics of the song encapsulate the essence of a potion that promises a good summer experience. In the chorus, Lipa sings about, "Late night conversations, electric emotions/ Sprinkled with a little bit of sex and it's a potion [...] Late night bodies aching, mental stimulation/ Sprinkled with a little bit of sex appeal and it's a moment."

Critical reception 

Upon its release, "Potion" generally garnered a positive reception from music critics. Paolo Ragusa from Consequence highlighted Lipa and Thug's vocals as well as Harris' production in the song as a demonstration of his competence to "work with any kind of artist to accomplish his vision". Dylan Green for Pitchfork also complimented Harris' "well-engineered" production, which he described as "sturdy enough to house a steamy Lipa hook and a nimble verse from Thug". Samantha Reis of We Rave You labeled the song as a "hot and sensual" song, showcasing Harris' ability to effortlessly create his "especially ones that manage to perform equally bombastically on radio and on the dancefloor". Rachel Narozniak from Dancing Astronaut commended Lipa's "inimitable mezzo-soprano" and Thug's "flair" also feeling the song to be a "seamless continuation of the Funk Wav [Bounces Vol. 1] sound". Chris Deville for Stereogum commented that the song "taps right back into the first volume's fun beachside vibe". Isabel von Glahn of Westdeutscher Rundfunk (WDR) noted the song's "electrifying vibes", with Lipa and Thug complementing the sound perfectly, making it an "ideal summer pop track".

Starr Bowenbank from Billboard described the song as "sultry", with Lipa exuding a simmering sensuality, predicting it to be a "sweltering, soon-to-be hit that's primed for dominating party playlists". Katie Bein from the same publication characterised the song as a "summer jam", commenting that it fuses "Santana vibes with a lounge mood". Alex Gonzalez of Uproxx labeled the song as "funky", aligning with the "disco and synth-pop sounds of Lipa's Future Nostalgia" that is "edgy enough to serve as a bridge to her next". In reviewing the album Funk Wav Bounces Vol.2, Ryan Bulbeck from Renowned for Sound found "Potion" to "effectively encapsulate the records direction". Izzy Sigston for The Line of Best Fit regarded the song to be "the perfect potion for a unwinding on a sticky summer evening". Maura Johnston of Rolling Stone believed Lipa and Thug to "dissemble the art of seduction" on the song. While Hannah Mylrea from NME described it as a "sultry, carefree jam", Arwa Haider for Financial Times labeled the song as "tuneful" and "intoxicating". However, Ben Devlin of MusicOMH rendered the song as "nice" but opined that it "seems to lack impact". Owen Myers from Pitchfork viewed the song as Lipa's "weakest [...] underwhelming post-Future Nostalgia singles".

Commercial performance 

In the United Kingdom, "Potion" reached number 16 on the UK Singles Chart in the issue dated 3 June 2022, remaining on the ranking for 12 consecutive weeks. In September 2022, the song received a silver certification from the British Phonographic Industry (BPI) for shifting more than 200,000 units in the UK. In Australia, it peaked at number 32 on the ARIA Singles Chart and at number 35 on the New Zealand Singles Chart in New Zealand. In Canada, "Potion" reached number 31 on the Canadian Hot 100 and entered the top 50 on the CHR/Top 40 and Hot AC rankings, respectively. In the United States, the song debuted and peaked at number 71 the US Billboard Hot 100 in the issue dated 11 June 2022. It also reached the top 40 on the Adult Top 40 and Mainstream Top 40 charts, respectively. Reaching the top 10 in Croatia and Ireland, "Potion" reached the top 50 in the Czech Republic, Denmark, Greece, Hungary, Iceland, Lithuania, the Netherlands, Norway, Slovakia, Sweden and Switzerland. Furthermore, the song peaked at number 30 on the Billboard Global 200 ranking, having spent a total of nine weeks on the chart.

Music video 

An official music video for "Potion" premiered to Harris' official YouTube channel on 27 May 2022. The video was directed by Emil Nava, with whom Harris has established a longstanding partnership. Kris Smale of The Mill was recruited to color-grade the video, with the aspiration to incorporate a "1960s liquid light show into a digital and contemporary setting". At the opening of the psychedelic video, a camera is panning towards a tropical island in an ocean, gradually transitioning from a purple sunset ambiente to a darker twilight setting. Following that, Lipa is showcased singing the song from an overturned vintage car situated against a backdrop displaying a brightly illuminated sunset. Then, the singer and a troupe of dancers are seen dancing and walking down a hallway lit with neon lights. The appearance of Thug follows after that, where he can be seen performing alongside a band of four women in a setting adorned with shades of pink and red. As the video closes, a shot of Lipa leaning her head against Harris' shoulder can be seen. Reis from We Rave You commented that the video replicates the concept of the song and the "Funk Wav Bounces Project itself". Tomás Mier for Rolling Stone highlighted Lipa's appearance as "magically sexy" in the video.

Charts

Weekly charts

Year-end charts

Certifications

Release history

References 

2022 singles
2022 songs
Calvin Harris songs
Dua Lipa songs
Young Thug songs
Songs written by Calvin Harris
Songs written by Dua Lipa
Songs written by Young Thug
Songs written by Jessie Reyez
Sony Music singles